The 1981–82 Danish 1. division season was the 25th season of ice hockey in Denmark. Eight teams participated in the league, and Vojens IK won the championship. Herning IK was relegated.

Regular season

Playoffs

Semifinals
Vojens IK - Frederikshavn White Hawks 2:1 (4:2, 3:5, 9:1)
Rødovre Mighty Bulls - AaB Ishockey 2:0 (3:1, 4:2)

Final
Vojens IK - Rødovre Mighty Bulls 2:1 (2:4, 6:3, 5:3)

3rd place
AaB Ishockey - Frederikshavn White Hawks 2:1 (2:1, 2:5, 2:1)

Relegation
KSF Copenhagen - Herning IK 2:1 (5:2, 2:4, 5:2)
Rungsted IK - Hellerup IK 2:1 (3:4, 2:1, 5:3)
Rungsted IK - KSF Copenhagen 2-0 on series
Hellerup IK - Herning IK 2-1 on series

External links
Season on eliteprospects.com

Dan
1981 in Danish sport
1982 in Danish sport